Holy Motors is a 2012 fantasy drama film written and directed by Leos Carax and starring Denis Lavant and Édith Scob. Lavant plays Mr. Oscar, a man who appears to have a job as an actor, as he is seen dressing up in different costumes and performing various roles in several locations around Paris over the course of a day, though no cameras or audiences are ever seen around him. The film competed for the Palme d'Or at the 2012 Cannes Film Festival.

Plot
A man wakes up and finds a secret door in his apartment. He opens it and wanders into a movie theater full of sleeping patrons. A naked child and several dogs wander the aisles.

Meanwhile, in Paris, a rich man waves goodbye to his family and gets into a white limousine. His driver, Céline, calls him Mr. Oscar and tells him he has nine appointments that day. He reads a file, uncovers a mirror, and begins to brush a grey wig. Over the course of the day, he:
 plays an old woman beggar on the Pont Alexandre III.
 dons a motion capture suit and enters an empty sound stage, where he performs action sequences while being directed by an unseen man. A woman in a motion capture suit enters, and the pair perform movements that are used to create a sex scene between animated snakelike creatures.
 plays the role of Monsieur Merde, an eccentric and violent red-haired man who lives in the sewers and kidnaps a beautiful model called Kay M. from a photo shoot in a cemetery.
 plays a father who picks up his daughter from a party in an old red car. They argue when the daughter reveals she spent the party hiding in the bathroom instead of socializing.
 (as an interlude) plays a song on the accordion in a church with an ever-growing group of musicians.
 plays a gangster assigned to murder a man who looks identical to him. After he has stabbed the man in the neck and carved scars into the man's face that match his own, the victim suddenly stabs Oscar in the neck. Oscar manages to limp his way back to the limousine, seemingly severely injured. While Oscar is removing his makeup, a man with a port-wine stain on his face reveals his presence in the limo. The man asks Oscar if he still enjoys his work, since he has looked "tired" recently. Oscar admits it is harder now that he cannot see the cameras, but says he continues for "the beauty of the act".
 yells at Céline to stop, runs from the limo wearing a red balaclava covered with barbed wire, and shoots a banker who looks just like he did in the morning when he left for his first appointment. He is gunned down by the banker's bodyguards and Céline rushes to him. As she leads him away, she apologizes and says there has been a mix-up.
 plays the elderly "Mr. Vogan", who enters a hotel and gets into bed in one of the rooms. Vogan's niece Léa enters, they talk about their lives, and he dies. While Léa cries, Oscar gets out of bed and excuses himself to go to another appointment. He asks Léa her real name, and she says it is Élise and that she also has another appointment.
 (in what does not seem to be one of his appointments) is almost hit by another white limousine, whose female passenger he recognizes. Still in pajamas, Oscar asks if they can talk, and they go to the abandoned La Samaritaine building, where Jean (the woman) says they have 20 minutes to catch up on the past 20 years before her "partner" arrives and she will play the last night of an air hostess named Eva Grace. As they ascend to the roof of the building, she sings a wistful song that indicates she and Oscar "once had a child". Oscar leaves her and, avoiding the male partner on the staircase, returns to his limo. When he sees that Eva and the partner have jumped to their deaths from the top of the building, he lets out an anguished cry and runs past them and directly back into the limo as he does so.
 plays a man whose wife and children are chimpanzees.

Alone, Céline drives to the Holy Motors garage, which is filled with other limousines. She parks, places a teal mask on her face, and leaves. The moment she is gone, the limousines begin to talk to one another, expressing fear that they are outdated and unwanted.

Cast
 Denis Lavant as Mr. Oscar / The Banker / The Beggar / The Motion Capture Actor / Monsieur Merde / The Father / The Accordionist / The Killer / The Killed / The Dying / The Man at Home
 Édith Scob as Céline
 Eva Mendes as Kay M.
 Kylie Minogue as Eva Grace (Jean)
 Élise L'Homeau as Léa (Élise)
 Jeanne Disson as Angèle
 Michel Piccoli as The Man with a Birthmark
 Leos Carax as The Sleeper

Production

Development
Before the production of Holy Motors, Carax had tried to fund a big English-language film for five years. Financiers were reluctant to invest, so Carax, whose previous feature film was Pola X in 1999, decided to make a smaller French-language film first, with the aim of regaining prominence in international cinema. Taking inspiration from the omnibus Tokyo!, for which he had made a commissioned short film (Merde, which featured the original appearance of the character Monsieur Merde), he wrote a cheap film intended for his regular collaborator Denis Lavant. Carax was able to sway potential investors concerned with the film's budget by switching to digital photography, a process of which he strongly disapproves.

The spark for the film came from Carax's observation that stretch limousines were being increasingly used for weddings. He was interested in their bulkiness, saying: "They're outdated, like the old futurist toys of the past. I think they mark the end of an era, the era of large, visible machines." From that grew an idea for a film about the increasing digitalisation of society, a science-fiction scenario where organisms and visible machines share a common superfluity. The opening scene was inspired by the E. T. A. Hoffmann novella Don Juan, about a man who discovers a secret door in his bedroom that leads to an opera house.

Holy Motors was produced through Pierre Grise Productions for a budget of €3.9 million, which included money from the CNC, Île-de-France region, Arte France, Canal+, and Ciné+. It was a 20% German co-production through the company Pandora, and received €350,000 from the Franco-German co-production support committee.

Casting
Of the lead role, Carax said: "If Denis had said no, I would have offered the part to Lon Chaney or to Chaplin. Or to Peter Lorre or Michel Simon, all of whom are dead."

Édith Scob had previously worked with Carax on Les Amants du Pont-Neuf, but was then almost entirely cut out, so Carax felt he owed her a larger role. He also thought Holy Motors was indebted to Georges Franju's Eyes Without a Face, in which Scob starred, and decided to give an explicit nod to the film by casting her.

The character Kay M. came from a canceled project that was supposed to star Lavant and Kate Moss and follow the Merde character from Tokyo! in the United States. Eva Mendes was offered the role after she and Carax met at a film festival and agreed to make a film together.

Carax discovered Kylie Minogue after Claire Denis suggested her for a canceled project.

Michel Piccoli's role was originally intended for Carax himself, but he decided it would be misleading to cast a filmmaker. When Piccoli was cast, the idea was to make him unrecognizable and credit him under a pseudonym, but news of his casting reached the media, so that plan was dropped.

Filming and post-production
Principal photography took place in Paris. Filming started in September 2011 and ended in November.

The music in the film includes Minogue performing the song "Who Were We?" by Carax and Neil Hannon, as well as Dmitri Shostakovich's String Quartet No. 15 and the track "Sinking of Bingou-Maru" from Godzilla. There are also songs by Sparks, Manset, KONGOS, and R. L. Burnside.

Release
The film premiered on 23 May 2012 in competition at the 65th Cannes Film Festival, after which Variety reported that the screening was met with "whooping and hollering" and "a storm of critical excitement on Twitter". It was released in France on 4 July 2012 through Les Films du Losange.

Reception

Critical reception
On review aggregator website Rotten Tomatoes, the film has an approval rating of 92% based on 196 reviews, with an average rating of 8.2/10; the website's critical consensus reads: "Mesmerizingly strange and willfully perverse, Holy Motors offers an unforgettable visual feast alongside a spellbinding – albeit unapologetically challenging – narrative." On Metacritic, the film has a weighted average of score of 84/100 based on 34 reviews, indicating "universal acclaim".

Peter Bradshaw of The Guardian rated the film five out of five and wrote: "Leos Carax's Holy Motors is weird and wonderful, rich and strange – barking mad, in fact. It is wayward, kaleidoscopic, black comic and bizarre; there is in it a batsqueak of genius, dishevelment and derangement; it is captivating and compelling. ... [T]his is what we have all come to Cannes for: for something different, experimental, a tilting at windmills, a great big pole-vault over the barrier of normality by someone who feels that the possibilities of cinema have not been exhausted by conventional realist drama." He later named it one of the year's 10 best films. Robbie Collin of The Daily Telegraph gave the film five stars, writing: "It is a film about the stuff of cinema itself, and is perhaps the strongest contender for the Palme d’Or yet." On his "Views From The Edge" blog, Spencer Hawken wrote: "Holy Motors is a mind-boggling movie, with oodles of character; it’s funny, emotional, and surprising. It has images that will stay in your head, most notably the accordion interlude, which comes completely out of nowhere, and really takes things up a gear." William Goss of Film.com wrote: "In terms of pure cinematic sensation, Holy Motors stands as one of the most delightfully enigmatic movies that I've seen in quite some time." Manohla Dargis of The New York Times called Holy Motors one of 2012's 10 best films.

The film placed fourth on Sight & Sounds critics' poll of the best films of 2012, third on The Village Voices annual poll of film critics, and first on both Film Comments and Indiewires year-end film critics' polls. French film magazine Cahiers du cinéma also named Holy Motors the best film of the year. In 2016, it was chosen as the 16th-greatest film of the 21st century by a worldwide group of critics polled by the BBC.

Best lists
Holy Motors was on numerous critics' and publications' lists of the best films of 2012. 

 1st – Michael Sicinski
 1st – Les Inrockuptibles
 1st – Matt Singer, IndieWire
 1st – David Ehrlich, IndieWire
 1st – Richard Brody, The New Yorker
 1st – Eric Kohn, IndieWire
 1st – Film Comment
 1st – Mike D'Angelo, The A.V. Club
 1st – Cahiers du Cinéma
 2nd – Miriam Bale, Fandor
 2nd – Jonathan Marlow, Fandor
 2nd – Kevin B. Lee, Fandor
 2nd – Andrew O'Hehir, Salon
 2nd – Karina Longworth, The Village Voice
 2nd – Slant
 3rd – Nick Schager, Slant
 3rd – Bilge Ebiri, They live by night
 3rd – Cinema Scope
 4th – Manohla Dargis, The New York Times
 4th – Little White Lies
 4th – The A.V. Club
 4th – Scott Tobias, The A.V. Club
 5th – Ty Burr, The Boston Globe
 5th – Peter Bradshaw, The Guardian
 5th – Noel Murray, The A.V. Club
 5th – Darren Hughes, Long Pauses
 5th – Reverse Shot
 6th – Allison Willmore, The A.V. Club
 7th – Sean Burns, Philadelphia Weekly
 7th – Ben Sachs, The Chicago Reader
 8th – Wesley Morris, The Boston Globe
 Top 8 (unranked) – Anthony Lane, The New Yorker
 9th – The L Magazine
 9th – Glenn Kenny, Some Came Running
 10th – Fernando F. Croce, Slant
 10th – Matt Prigge, Philadelphia Weekly
 10th – Keith Phipps, The A.V. Club
 Top 10 (unranked) – David Edelstein, New York
 12th – Sam Adams, The A.V. Club
 13th – Empire
 Top 15 (unranked) – Dana Stevens, Slate 
 Top 16 (unranked) – Dennis Cooper
 20th – The Huffington Post
 Top 20 (unranked) – Michael Phillips, The Chicago Tribune
 Top 25 (narrative films, unranked);– Dennis Harvey, The San Francisco Bay Guardian

It was also featured on many critics' and publications' lists of the best films of the 2010s:

 2nd – Cahiers du Cinéma
 3rd – Rolling Stone
 5th – Jonathan Rosenbaum as submitted to Caimán Cuadernos de Cine
 6th – IndieWire
 7th – Reverse Shot
 9th – Jordan Cronk
 9th – Glenn Kenny, Some Came Running
 10th – Cinema Scope
 11th – Matt Singer, ScreenCrush
 Top 11 (unranked) – Miriam Bale
 13th – Hyperallergic
 14th – The A.V. Club
 16th – Ty Burr, The Boston Globe
 Top 17 (unranked);– Eric Allen Hatch
 Top 21 (between 12-21, unranked) – Nicole Brenez as submitted to The Toronto Film Review
 25th – Jordan Ruimy, World of Reel
 Top 27 (unranked);– Richard Brody, The New Yorker
 36th – The Playlist
 43rd – Time Out (New York)
 43rd – Susannah Gruder
 Top 50 (unranked);– Nellie Killian
 59th – Paste
 Top 70 (between 26-70, unranked) – RogerEbert.com
 90th – Film School Rejects

According to They Shoot Pictures, Don't They?, Holy Motors is the 11th-most critically acclaimed film of the 21st century and the 283rd-most critically acclaimed film of all time.

Accolades

See also

List of films featuring fictional films

Notes

References

External links
 
 
 
 

2012 films
2010s crime drama films
2010s fantasy drama films
2012 independent films
Chinese-language films
English-language French films
English-language German films
Films directed by Leos Carax
Films set in a movie theatre
Films set in Paris
Films shot in Paris
French crime drama films
French fantasy drama films
French independent films
2010s French-language films
German crime drama films
German fantasy drama films
German independent films
2012 drama films
2010s English-language films
2010s French films
2010s German films
2012 multilingual films
French multilingual films
German multilingual films
French-language German films